Ralph W. Hess (born December 25, 1939) is a former member of the Pennsylvania State Senate, serving from 1971 to 1990.

References

Republican Party Pennsylvania state senators
Living people
1939 births